The Scatter Creek Unit is a 915-acre protected area and wildlife reserve in southern Thurston County, Washington, USA It is located just north of Grand Mound, Washington and east of Rochester, Washington. The site is owned and managed by the Washington Department of Fish and Wildlife and is one of five units that comprise the Scatter Creek Wildlife Area. The site is split into two sections, the North site and the South site. The area is the site of a former homestead.

The Scatter Creek Unit is home to one of the few remaining sections of south Puget Sound prairie. Garry oaks (Quercus garryana) can be found growing in riparian areas, along with Oregon ash (Fraxinus latifolia). In the forested hills on the north side of the reserve, conifers such as Douglas fir (Pseudotsuga menziesii) predominate.

Mima mounds can be found at both the North and South site.

References

External links

 Scatter Creek Wildlife Area Unit
Protected areas of Thurston County, Washington
Landforms of Thurston County, Washington